= Mallapur Kariyat Nesargi =

- Village
- Location in Karnataka, India Mallapur Kariyat Nesargi (India)
- Coordinates: 15.921890°N 74.774580°E
- Country: India
- State: Karnataka
- District: Belgaum

Languages
  - Official: Kannada
- Time zone: UTC+5:30 (IST)

Mallapur Kariyat Nesargi is a village in Belgaum district of Karnataka, India.
